Hameed Youssef Al-Qallaf (born 10 August 1987) is a Kuwaiti football player who plays for Kuwait SC as goalkeeper.

Honours

With Al-Arabi SC 
2013-14: Kuwait Federation Cup
2014-15: Kuwait Crown Prince Cup

External links

1987 births
Living people
Kuwaiti footballers
2011 AFC Asian Cup players
2015 AFC Asian Cup players
Al-Arabi SC (Kuwait) players
Footballers at the 2006 Asian Games
Kuwait international footballers
Association football goalkeepers
Asian Games competitors for Kuwait
Al Salmiya SC players
Kuwait Premier League players
Kuwait SC players
Al-Yarmouk SC (Kuwait) players
Expatriate footballers in Oman
Oman Professional League players
Kuwaiti expatriate footballers
Kuwaiti expatriate sportspeople in Oman